Teodora Pušić (born 12 March 1993) is a Serbian volleyball player for CSM Targoviste and the Serbian national team.

She participated at the 2017 Women's European Volleyball Championship.

Awards

National team

Senior Team
 2017 World Grand Prix -  Bronze Medal
 2017 European Championship -  Gold Medal
 2018 World Championship -  Gold Medal
 2019 European Championship -  Gold Medal
 2022 FIVB Nations League -  Bronze Medal
 2022 World Championship -  Gold Medal

Individual awards
 2022 World Championship "Best Libero"

References

External links

 

1993 births
Living people
Serbian women's volleyball players
Serbian expatriate sportspeople in Germany
Serbian expatriate sportspeople in Romania
European champions for Serbia
21st-century Serbian women